Esther Kellner (1908–1998) was a writer, animal lover, and director of Wayne County, Indiana Civil Defense.

She was born in New Lisbon, Indiana and graduated from Morton High School in Richmond, Indiana in 1926. She began her writing career at age 20 as editor of a children's magazine, Play Mate.

She became involved with the Wayne County Civil Defense in 1965 while writing her book, The Long Silence, about the fire that destroyed the switch office of the local phone company and left the area without phone service for several months. Another noted book, Death in a Sunny Street, chronicled the 1968 Richmond, Indiana explosion that destroyed several downtown blocks and killed 41 people.

She wrote seventeen books, both fiction and nonfiction, including: The Devil and Aunt Serena, Moonshine: Its History and Folklore, and The Background of the Old Testament.

Known as a friend to lost and injured animals , she also wrote Animals Come to My House: A Story Guide to the Care of Small Wild Animals.

Published works
Fiction
 Mary of Nazareth  (Appleton-Century-Crofts, 1958)      
 The Promise  (1956)             
 The Bride of Pilate (1959)

Nonfiction
 Animals Come to My House (New York: Putnam, c1976)          
 Background of the Old Testament (1963)  
 Death in a Sunny Street (1968) about the Richmond, Indiana explosion that occurred on April 6, 1968.
 Devil and Aunt Serena (1968)                    
 Long Silence (1965)                                   
 Moonshine (1971)                                         
 Out of the Woods (1964)

References

External links
Morrisson-Reeves Library, Richmond, Indiana  - Esther A. Kellner (1908-1998)
Indiana State Library - Children's Authors & Illustrators - Kellner, Esther
Our Land, Our Literature - Esther A. Kellner

1908 births
1998 deaths
20th-century American novelists
20th-century American women writers
American women novelists
Writers from Richmond, Indiana
Novelists from Indiana